1922 in philosophy

Events

Publications
 John Dewey, Human Nature and Conduct (1922)
 Bertrand Russell, The Problem of China (1922)
 Lucien Lévy-Bruhl, Primitive Mentality (1922)

Births
 January 10 - Michel Henry (died 2002)
 January 20 - John Hick (died 2012)
 January 21 - Predrag Vranicki (died 2002)
 February 9 - Arnold Keyserling (died 2005)
 February 26 - Kurt Rudolf Fischer (died 2014)
 February 27 - Hans Rookmaaker (died 1977)
 March 7 - Akira Yamada (died 2008)
 March 11 - Cornelius Castoriadis (died 1997)
 March 15 - Karl-Otto Apel (died 2017)
 March 17 - Patrick Gardiner (died 1997)
 March 17 - Patrick Suppes (died 2014)
 March 25 - Stephen Toulmin (died 2009)
 April 25 - Krishnananda Saraswati (died 2001)
 April 25 - Tomás Maldonado (died 2018)
 May 3 - Elena Topuridze (died 2004)
 May 5 - Gabriel Nuchelmans (died 1996)
 May 23 - Gerald Holton 
 June 21 - Léon Ashkenazi (died 1996)
 June 25 - Shunsuke Tsurumi (died 2015)
 July 16 - Arturo Andrés Roig (died 2012)
 July 18 - Thomas Kuhn (died 1996)
 September 22 - Hussein-Ali Montazeri (died 2009)
 October 5 - Kripalu Maharaj (died 2013)
 October 29 - Aleksandr Zinovyev (died 2006)
 November 9 - Imre Lakatos (died 1974)
 November 11 - Jindřich Zelený (died 1997)
 November 18 - Viktor Grigoryevich Afanasyev (died 1994)
 November 19 - Tomonubu Imamichi (died 2012)
 November 24 - Martti Olavi Siirala (died 2008)
 November 28 - Pinchas Lapide (died 1997)
 November 30 - John Raymond Smythies
 December 19 - Sara Grant (died 2002)
 December 25 - Mohammed Aziz Lahbabi (died 1993)
 December 26 - Matthew Lipman (died 2010)
 Philip Hallie (died 1994)
 Charles Leonard Hamblin (died 1985)
 Leonard Linsky (died 2012)
 William S. Sahakian (died 1986)

Deaths
 February 11 - Gerard Bolland (born 1854)
 February 22 - A. D. Gordon (born 1856)
 February 24 - Alfred Espinas (born 1844)
 April 9 - Emily Elizabeth Constance Jones (born 1848)
 April 10 - Swami Brahmananda (born 1863)
 July 21 - Swami Turiyananda (born 1863)
 August 1 - Paul Barth (sociologist) (born 1858)
 August 4 - Canchupati Venkatrao Venkaswami Rao (born 1922)
 August 29 - Georges Sorel (born 1847)
 September 16 - Gabriel Jean Edmond Séailles (born 1852)
 November 29 - Renzo Novatore (born 1890)
 Tōten Miyazaki (born 1871)
 Lev Tikhomirov

Philosophy
20th-century philosophy
Philosophy by year